Blue (stylized as blue) is the second studio album by American punk rock band Down by Law. It was released on September 25, 1992, by Epitaph Records on compact disc, compact cassette and phonograph record. The release was their second to be recorded at Westbeach Recorders studio in Culver City, California and produced by Epitaph Records owner Brett Gurewitz; co-produced by Donnell Cameron.

The album's artwork was designed by vocalist and rhythm guitarist David Smalley's wife, Caroline Murphy Smalley, in collaboration with Epitaph Records' contract art director Joy Aoki and illustrator Michael Koelsch. Blue was Down by Law's final release to feature the band's original line-up, as drummer David Nazworthy, lead guitarist Christopher Bagarozzi and bass guitarist Edward Urlik left immediately after the completion of its promotional tour.

Track listing 
Songwriting credits are adapted from the album's liner notes.

Personnel
Credits are adapted from the album's liner notes.

Down by Law
 David Smalley - Vocals, rhythm guitar
 David Nazworthy - Drums; vocals on "Turn Away"
 Edward Urlik - Bass guitar; vocals on "Finally Here"
 Christopher Bagarozzi - Lead guitar

Production and design

 Brett Gurewitz - Producer
 Donnell Cameron - Producer, engineer
 Joe Peccerillo - Engineer
 Joy Aoki - Artwork
 Michael Koelsch - Artwork
 Caroline Murphy Smalley - Design, photography

References

External links
 
 

Down by Law (band) albums
1992 albums
Epitaph Records albums
Album covers by Michael Koelsch